The Blair Bridge is a wooden covered bridge originally built in 1829, that crosses the Pemigewasset River near Campton, New Hampshire, United States. It connects New Hampshire Route 175 to the east and U.S. Route 3 and Interstate 93 to the west.

The bridge was damaged during Tropical Storm Irene on August 28, 2011. After this period, the bridge underwent many structural repairs by master bridgewright Arnold M. Graton and reopened in early 2015, with a weight limit of six tons per vehicle—twice as much as the old limit of three tons. As with many covered bridges, it is only wide enough for one lane of traffic; opposing traffic must wait until the bridge has cleared.

See also
List of New Hampshire covered bridges
New Hampshire Historical Marker No. 196: Blair Bridge

References

External links
"NH Covered Bridges - Blair Bridge #41", NewHampshire.com
"Blair Bridge", New Hampshire Covered Bridges from the New Hampshire Division of Historical Resources

Covered bridges in New Hampshire
Bridges in Grafton County, New Hampshire
Tourist attractions in Grafton County, New Hampshire
Road bridges in New Hampshire
New Hampshire State Register of Historic Places
Wooden bridges in New Hampshire
Long truss bridges in the United States
1829 establishments in New Hampshire
Bridges completed in 1829